A throttle is any mechanism by which the power or speed of an engine is controlled.

Throttle or throttling may also refer to:

Fiction
 Throttle (film), a 2005 thriller
 Throttle (novella), a 2009 novella by Stephen King and his son Joe Hill
 Throttle, one of the three main characters of Biker Mice from Mars

Science and technology
 Rocket engine throttling
 Thrust lever or throttle lever, a device for controlling aircraft engines
 Throttling process (thermodynamics), an isenthalpic process in thermodynamics

Computing
 CPU throttling, computer hardware speed control, also known as dynamic frequency scaling
 Bandwidth throttling, used to control the bandwidth that a network application can use
 Throttling process (computing), software speed control

Other uses
 Strangling, compression of the neck
 DVD-by-mail throttling, the process of penalizing the most active users in subscription-based DVD-by-mail businesses, by slowing shipments or sending less desirable movies
 Dave Wottle (born 1950), American athlete nicknamed "The Throttle"

See also
 Teddy at the Throttle, a 1917 American comedy short film